El Bosque is a town and municipality located in the province of Cádiz, Spain. According to the 2005 census, the city has a population of 2,004 inhabitants.

Demographics

Gallery

References

External links 

El Bosque - Sistema de Información Multiterritorial de Andalucía

Municipalities of the Province of Cádiz